The Type 15 frigate was a class of British anti-submarine frigates of the Royal Navy. They were conversions based on the hulls of World War II-era destroyers built to the standard War Emergency Programme "utility" design.

History
By 1945 the wartime "utility" vessels were obsolescent as destroyers due to their relatively small size and makeshift armament. Rapid advances in German U-boat technology with the  Type XXI and  Type XXVI rendered even some of the most modern Royal Navy escorts obsolete. The Royal Navy began designing and constructing new fast anti-submarine frigates of the Type 12 and Type 14 design to counter this threat. However, it would be some time before these vessels could be brought into service and budget constraints limited the number of new hulls that could be constructed.

The solution to the problem lay in the 47 War Emergency Programme destroyers that remained in Royal Navy service, most of which were only a few years old and had seen little active service. Accordingly, plans were drawn up to convert these vessels into fast anti-submarine frigates incorporating as many lessons learned during wartime experience as possible. Ultimately, 23 of the utility destroyers were fully converted into Type 15 first-rate anti-submarine frigates, and a further ten were given limited conversions, and designated Type 16 frigates.

Conversion
Before conversion began, all superstructure, weaponry, masts and equipments were removed and the machinery was overhauled. The forecastle was extended aft to leave only a small quarterdeck, providing much improved accommodation, the lack and poor quality of which had been a source of constant problem for large wartime crews. A new single-level superstructure incorporating the fully enclosed bridge (a novelty in a British escort ship), operations room and a sonar room was added spanning the full width of the hull in front of the funnel. The new superstructure layout allowed the crew to fight the ship without having to expose themselves to the elements, and was increasingly important in the age of nuclear weapons. New lattice masts were provided to carry the range of radars, HF/DF and communications equipment that were now required for a naval escort. This bridge had angled sides and raked windows, to allow good all-round vision and cut down on internal reflections at night.

A completely new suite of armaments and electronics was added, befitting their role as fast anti-submarine frigates. The principal anti-submarine armament was a pair of Mark 10 Limbo anti-submarine mortars. These three-barrelled weapons were based on the wartime Squid, and were mounted on the quarterdeck aft, where they were best protected from the weather. They had a 360° field of fire and were automatic in operation. It had been intended to carry a new anti-submarine weapon, the Mark 20E torpedo, in a pair of trainable tubes on each beam, but this weapon was a failure and the tubes, where fitted, never received weapons and were later removed. Rapid, Roebuck and all V and W-class ships carried Squids in lieu of Limbo due to insufficient funds existing to fit all ships with Limbo. For self-defence, a twin 4 inch gun on a Mounting Mark XIX was carried aft, controlled by the MRS-1 Close Range Blind-Fire director (CRBF). Behind the bridge was fitted a twin 40 mm Bofors gun on a "utility" Mounting Mark V.

Many vessels were used during their peacetime service as seagoing training ships, for which purposes the 40 mm gun was removed and a large open bridge was added above the rounded face of the existing bridge. Undaunted was built with a flight deck aft, and was used for trials of the Fairey Ultra-light and Saunders Roe P531 helicopters. Undaunted became the first frigate to carry and operate a helicopter. Grenville had a flight deck fitted in 1959, but this was later removed.

Ships
23 ships were converted, in a programme that lasted between 1949 and 1957.

Type 15s in film and models
HMS Wakeful and HMS Troubridge were both used in the filming of the 1965 cold-war drama The Bedford Incident, to depict the fictional "USS Bedford".  The main exterior shots used a large model of a US , but Wakefuls Type 15 outline and F159 pennant number are clearly visible in the opening sequence, when Sidney Poitier arrives in a Whirlwind helicopter.  Many of the interior shots were filmed in Troubridge, and British military equipment, including a rack of Lee–Enfield rifles and Troubridges novel forward-sloping bridge windows, can be seen.

In 1959 Triang Minic Ships produced a series of 1:1200 (one inch to 100 feet) metal models of Type 15 frigates, carrying the names Vigilant, Venus, Virago and Volage; the first two have open bridges, while the others' are closed. These toys were mass-produced in large numbers between 1959 and 1965, and did much to raise awareness of the post-war navy for the younger generation. At the same time the Frog (models) company produced an accurate plastic model kit of HMS Undine to a scale of 1:500. The moulds for this were sold to Russia in 1976, and it has been re-issued under the "Novo" trademark on several occasions. More recently, Uk company MT Miniatures has produced a 1:700th scale model of HMS Relentless in resin, white metal, and photo-etched brass.

See also

War Emergency Programme destroyers: The destroyer building programme that the Type 15 frigates were converted from.
Type 16 frigate: A more limited conversion of destroyer hulls than the Type 15.
The Royal Australian Navy converted four out of five of their Q-class destroyers to Type 15 frigates from 1953–57. The other ship, was scrapped in 1958.

Bibliography

 "Royal Navy Frigates 1945-1983" Leo Marriott, Ian Allan, 1983,

Notes

Frigate classes
Ship classes of the Royal Navy